The 1978 German Grand Prix was a Formula One motor race held on 30 July 1978 at the Hockenheimring. Mario Andretti won the race from pole position, ahead of Jody Scheckter and Jacques Laffite.

Report
This was the debut race of future world champion Nelson Piquet. Mario Andretti took pole with Ronnie Peterson in second and Niki Lauda third. At the start, Peterson got off better and took the lead from Andretti, and held it for four laps before Andretti retook it. Lauda ran third in the early stages, before he was passed by Alan Jones, and the duo battled until Lauda's engine failed, his fifth engine related retirement of the year. The two Lotus cars were cruising at the front, and Jones ran third comfortably until he retired with a fuel vaporization problem. Lotus's hopes of a 1–2 ended when Peterson's gearbox failed, Andretti was unaffected by that and cruised to his fifth win of the season, with Jody Scheckter second and Jacques Laffite third.

Classification

Pre-qualifying 

 Positions in red and an asterisk indicate entries that failed to pre-qualify.

Qualifying 

 Positions in red and an asterisk indicate entries that failed to qualify.

Race

Championship standings after the race 

Drivers' Championship standings

Constructors' Championship standings

Note: Only the top five positions are included for both sets of standings.

References

German Grand Prix
German Grand Prix
German Grand Prix